The India women's national under-20 football team represents India in international women's under-20 football in the AFC U-19 Women's Championship and the FIFA U-20 Women's World Cup. It is controlled by the AIFF. They also participated in the 2021–22 Indian Women's League season, as Indian Arrows Women.

History

FIFA U-20 Women's World Cup
FIFA organised U20 women's world cup in 2002 for the first time, and for qualification from Asian teams, only the finalist from AFC U-19 Women's Championship is allowed to enter into the tournament, which was also the same criteria for the next edition and since 2006 the top three teams from AFC U19 championships would be allowed to enter into U20 world cup. India failed to qualify for the FIFA U-20 Women's World Cup as they failed to be finalist in any AFC U19 Championships till 2017 edition.

AFC U-19 Women's Championship
The AFC U-19 Women's Championship serves as a qualifying competition for the FIFA U-20 Women's World Cup. For first three edition from 2002, it had been organised on every even years, and in all those three championships India participated. After 2006 Championship, it had been organised on every odd years since 2007 and coincidentally India failed to qualify for the Championships since then.

India hosted the inaugural AFC U-19 Women's Championship in 2002. India U-19 failed to advance beyond group stage, finishing third in group. Indian girls lost to eventual champions Japan by 9−0 and South Korea by 4−0, only had a win against Guam by 6−0 but did not help much to move forward.

In next edition of championship held in China, India done well to reach quarter finals, winning against Hong Kong by 2−1, Singapore by 1−0 and a loss against Chinese Tapei by 0−3, and reaching the quarter final, their FIFA U20 Worldcup dream was shattered as was knocked out by North Korea by 0−10.

For 2006 edition the qualification round started for AFC U19 Women's Championship, where India easily qualified, defeating Kyrgyzstan by 7−0 and Bangladesh by 9−0 which was their biggest win that time. 2006 AFC U-19 Women's Championship saw India finishing bottom of group, consisting of Asian heavyweights South Korea, North Korea and Japan, defeated by all these three team by huge goal difference of 11−0, 14−0 and 6−0 respectively. That's the last time India made it into the group stage of the AFC U-19 Women's Championship.

At the 2007 qualification India lost two games in the group stage against Myanmar by 1−2 and Thailand by 1−5 which cost the AFC Championships for the first time in 2007 edition. Similar fate was in 2009 qualification tournament which was worse than before as India lost all the group matches and the worst performance came against Australia, where the Australian girls defeated the Indian by a huge 18−0, thus their biggest defeat till now. Next four edition, the girls seen similar scenario with zero luck to enter in the championships. For 2019 AFC U-19 Women's Championship India faced Pakistan, Nepal and Thailand in round 1 at the 2019 Championship qualification where they won two match defeating Pakistan by 18−0 which is their biggest win till now and host Thailand by 1−0 and a defeat by Nepal with 0−2, but India failed to move to round 2 courtesy of their head-to-head result against Nepal. While Thailand, Nepal and India finished on three points, the goal difference between just these three teams were counted, which left Thailand at the top with a +2 goal difference, while India and Nepal were tied at -1, due to this, the head-to-head result between India and Nepal came into play again, and Nepal go through and India left behind.

SAFF U-18 Women's Championship
2018 SAFF U-18 Women's Championship, at Bhutan, is the inaugural edition of the SAFF U18 championships being organised by SAFF on every even years to align with the AFC U19 Championships and FIFA U20 Worldcup. It's a preparatory tournament for the South Asian teams for AFC U19 championship qualification round. India thrashed host Bhutan and Maldives by 4−0 and 8−0 respectively in the group matches, reaching to the semi-finals they lost to Nepal through penalty shoot-out by 1−3 as the full-time ended in a 1−1 tie, thus their dream of first SAFF u18 champion ended here but they won the third place in the tournament by defeating Bhutan again by a solitary goal.

Results and fixtures
Legend

2021

2022

2023

Coaching staff

Current coaching staff

Players

Current squad
The following 23 players were called for the 2024 AFC U-20 Women's Asian Cup qualification.

Recent call-ups

Competitive record

FIFA U-20 Women's World Cup
India has never qualified for the under-20 women's world cup, but had come close to qualify in 2004 where they needed to qualify for finals but ended up getting knocked out in quarterfinals.

AFC U-20 Women's Asian Cup
India was the first nation to host AFC U-20 women's championship. In that edition, they failed to progress to the knockouts stage as they finished below South Korea and Japan. However, in the next edition India qualified for the quarterfinals, but were thrashed 10–0 by North Korea. In the next edition, which was also the last time they played this tournament, India suffered massive defeats as they finished bottom of their group of four teams with -31 as goal difference.

SAFF U-18/U-19/U-20 Women's Championship
{| class="wikitable collapsible" style="text-align: center;"
|-
!colspan=10 style="background: #FF8C00; color: #0000FF;|SAFF U-18/U-19/U-20 Women's Championship record
|-
! width="90" |Host/Year
! width="80" |Result
! width="80" |Position
! width="20" |
! width="20" |
! width="20" |
! width="20" |
! width="20" |
! width="20" |
! width="20" |
|- style="background:#cfaa88;"
| 2018 || Semi-final || 3rd || 4 || 3 || 0 || 1 || 14 || 1 || +13
|- style="background:silver"
| 2021 || Runners-up || 2nd || 5 || 3 || 0 || 2 || 9 || 2 || +7
|- style="background:gold"
| 2022 || Winners || 1st || 4 || 3 || 0 || 1 || 13 || 2 || +11
|-
| 2023 || Group stage || 3rd || 3 || 1 || 1 || 1 || 13 || 3 || +10
|-
||Total || 4/4 || 1 Title' || 16 || 10 || 1 || 5 || 49 || 8 || +41
|}DNP : Did Not ParticipateDNQ'' : Did Not Qualify

See also
India women's national football team
India women's national under-17 football team
India national football team
Indian Women's League

References

External links
India women's U-20 team page on the AIFF website

Youth football in India
Asian women's national under-20 association football teams
U20
Football